"All She Wrote" is the fourth and final single from the self-titled FireHouse album by the American rock band FireHouse. The single peaked at No. 58 on the Billboard Hot 100. The song was written by guitarist Bill Leverty and vocalist C.J. Snare. The promotional video for the song was filmed at the O.C. Tanner Amphitheater in Springdale, Utah.

References

External links
Music Video for "All She Wrote"

1991 singles
FireHouse (band) songs
1990 songs
Epic Records singles
Songs written by C. J. Snare
Songs written by Bill Leverty